HMS Tourmaline was an  destroyer, which served with the Royal Navy during the Greco-Turkish War and the Russian Civil War. Tourmaline was one of three destroyers ordered from Thornycroft in June 1917 with more powerful geared turbines than the majority of the class as well as design changes that improved seakeeping. Launched on 19 April 1919, the vessel operated as part of the Fourth Destroyer Flotilla serving with the Atlantic and Mediterranean Fleets. The London Naval Treaty, signed 1930, required the retirement of some destroyers to meet the Royal Navy's tonnage requirement and Tourmaline was chosen for retirement. The destroyer was decommissioned on 28 November 1931 after 12 years of service and broken up.

Design

Tourmaline was one of three  destroyers ordered by the British Admiralty from Thornycroft in June 1917 as part of the Twelfth War Construction Programme. The design was based on the  destroyer  built by the shipyard. Compared to the standard S-class vessels, the design, also known as Modified Rosalind, was longer, with a raised forward gun position and  torpedo tubes moved to a new position, both of which improved seakeeping. They also had provision for triple torpedo tubes. In a similar way to previous designs, Thornycroft also installed more powerful machinery to give the warship a higher top speed.

Displacement was  normal and  full load. Two funnels were fitted, the forward one larger in diameter.

Armament consisted of three QF  Mk IV guns on the ship's centreline. One was mounted raised on the forecastle, one between the funnels and one aft. The ship also mounted a single 2-pounder (40 mm) pom-pom anti-aircraft gun for air defence. A total of eight torpedoes were fitted, consisting of six  torpedo tubes in two triple rotating mounts aft and two  tubes on fixed mounts fitted athwartships. Complement was 90 officers and ratings.

Service
Laid down in January 1918 at Thornycroft's yard in Woolston, Southampton, Tourmaline was launched on 19 April 1919. On completion on 18 December that year, the ship joined the Fourth Destroyer Flotilla of the Atlantic Fleet under the  light cruiser . 
As part of fleet led by the dreadnought battleship , the ship was assigned to Constantinople as part of a wider presence to represent British interests in the conflicts in the Black Sea. The fleet was soon in action in support of the Volunteer Army fighting in the Southern Front of the Russian Civil War. For the destroyers, this often involved operations close to the coast in areas were the risks were highest. For example, while Tourmaline and sister ship  patrolled the area of the Black Sea between Novorossiysk and Tuapse between 1 and 10 November 1920, Tobago was fatally crippled after striking a mine.

Soon afterwards, Tourmaline was also damaged. After a period back in UK waters, when departing Portland on 17 January 1921 to rejoin the Fleet, the ship collided with the Yarrow-built  destroyer  and had to instead sail to Portsmouth for repairs. Soon afterwards, the Flotilla was allocated to the Mediterranean Fleet. The destroyer formed part of a fleet part of the Royal Navy's presence in the Greco-Turkish War. The ship was allocated to Constantinople and patrolled the areas around the Sea of Marmara While on this service, the ship took on the survivors from sister ship  when that vessel sank on 24 September 1922 with the loss of ten lives. On 15 May 1926, Tourmaline was recommissioned in Gibraltar to lead the Local Defence Flotilla. On 22 April 1930, the London Naval Treaty was signed, which limited total destroyer tonnage in the Navy. Tourmaline was one of those chosen to be retired and, on 28 November 1931, the destroyer was sold to Thos. W. Ward and broken up at Grays.

Pennant numbers

References

Citations

Bibliography

 
 
 
 
 
 
 
 

 

1919 ships
Ships built by John I. Thornycroft & Company
Ships built in Southampton
S-class destroyers (1917) of the Royal Navy